Sister Doris Engelhard is a Catholic nun and Bavarian brewmaster. Engelhard brews her beer in the Mallersdorf Abbey, and feels that "brewing is her way of serving God." Engelhard is the last nun working in Europe as a brewmaster.

Biography 
Engelhard is a Franciscan sister. In 1961, Engelhard started at Mallersdorf Abbey as a student. The nuns also helped take care of her sick mother. Engelhard wanted to be a nun after her experience, but her father felt she could pursue more lucrative career choices. So she thought about studying agriculture and then at the suggestion of the headmistress, studied brewing. She began her apprenticeship in 1966 and in 1969, she took her vows to join the convent. In 1975, she became the brewmaster in Mallersdorf Abbey, taking over from another sister who had been brewing there since the 1930s. In 1977, she was brewing 3,300 pints a year. Today, Mallersdorf brews about 80,000 gallons of beer a year. The beer brewed at Mallersdorf is not exported and is only consumed locally. The beer is untreated and needs to be drunk while it is still fresh.

References

External links 
 Sister Doris, Last Nun Brewing in the World (video in German and English)

21st-century German Roman Catholic nuns
German brewers
People from Bavaria
German beer culture
German Franciscans
Franciscan nuns
20th-century German Roman Catholic nuns